Sanys is a genus of moths of the family Erebidae. The genus was erected by Achille Guenée in 1852.

Species
Sanys bebryx Schaus, 1904 French Guiana
Sanys capsicata Schaus, 1901 Venezuela
Sanys carnina Guenée, 1852 Brazil (Rio de Janeiro)
Sanys coenotype Hampson, 1926 Peru
Sanys corticea Hampson, 1926 Peru
Sanys evanescens Schaus, 1901 Venezuela
Sanys gigas Hampson, 1926 Peru
Sanys irrosea Guenee, 1852 French Guiana
Sanys lara (Schaus, 1894) Mexico, Peru
Sanys leucocraspis Hampson, 1926 Peru
Sanys prioncera Hampson, 1926 Peru
Sanys pyrene Scahus, 1914 Suriname

See also
Self-Advocacy Association of New York State

References

Calpinae